Mount Stuart House, on the east coast of the Isle of Bute, Scotland, is a country house built in the Gothic Revival style and the ancestral home of the Marquesses of Bute. It was designed by Sir Robert Rowand Anderson for the 3rd Marquess in the late 1870s, replacing an earlier house by Alexander McGill, which burnt down in 1877.  The house is a Category A listed building.

Background
The house is the seat of the Stuarts of Bute, derived from the hereditary office "Steward of Bute" held since 1157. The family are direct male-line descendants of John Stewart, the illegitimate son of King Robert II of Scotland, the first Stuart King, by his mistress, Moira Leitch. By virtue of this descent, they are also descendants of Robert the Bruce, whose daughter Marjorie was mother of Robert II by her marriage to Walter Stewart, 6th High Steward of Scotland.

History

The original house was built in 1719 for The 2nd Earl of Bute, but was rebuilt for The 3rd Marquess of Bute following a fire on 3 December 1877. After his earlier creations of Cardiff Castle and Castell Coch in Cardiff, the Marquess used many of the builders and workman he had employed in South Wales, including William Burges and much of that architect's team.  Burges built an oratory at the house.  The main part of the present house is a flamboyant example of 19th-century Gothic Revival architecture, built in a reddish-brown stone. Mount Stuart's major features include the colonnaded Marble Hall at the centre of the main block and the Marble Chapel, which has an elaborate spired tower which is the tallest part of the building. Two earlier wings in a strikingly different style survive. They are much smaller in scale, have Georgian-style sash windows and are painted white.

Much of the furniture was custom-designed for the house by Robert Weir Schultz in the early years of the 20th century. He also laid out many sections of the gardens.

The Mount Stuart House claims to have the world's first heated pool in any house; it was also the first home in Scotland to be lit by electricity. 

The house holds The Bute Collection, a private collection of artwork and artefacts The Collection also houses archives, books, furniture, and silverwork reflecting the interests of the Bute family's various generations, including 25,000 books on topics including theology, botany, agriculture and Scottish history and literature. In April 2016 it was announced that a Shakespeare First Folio had been discovered in the House's Library. The folio belonged to Isaac Reed.

The house is open to the public.

Notes

References

Further reading

  Stamp, Gavin (1981). Robert Weir Schultz, Architect, and His Work for the Marquesses of Bute: An Essay.

External links
 Mount Stuart House & Gardens website

Listed houses in Scotland
Robert Rowand Anderson buildings
Inventory of Gardens and Designed Landscapes
H
Gardens in Argyll and Bute
Historic house museums in Argyll and Bute
Gothic Revival architecture in Scotland
Category A listed buildings in Argyll and Bute
Isle of Bute
Country houses in Argyll and Bute
Prime ministerial homes in the United Kingdom